Rareș Takács (born 10 December 1991) is a Romanian professional football player who plays as a defender for FK Csíkszereda.

Career
Born in Turda, Romania, Takács started playing football in his hometown as a youngster for Arieșul Turda. Later he moved to Cluj-Napoca at Ardealul Cluj and in 2010 he joined Universitatea Cluj together with other teammates. In 2012, he was loaned to the lower division teams CS Ștefănești and FCM Reșița but at the end of the year, he returned to Universitatea Cluj.

Takács made his debut in Liga I in May 2013, in a match that was lost by Universitatea Cluj in front of CFR Cluj.

Honours
Universitatea Cluj
 Liga III: 2017–18

References

External links
 Profile on Universitatea Cluj official site
 

1991 births
Living people
People from Turda
Romanian footballers
Association football midfielders
ACS Sticla Arieșul Turda players
Liga I players
FC Universitatea Cluj players
Liga II players
FC Olimpia Satu Mare players
CS Sportul Snagov players
FK Csíkszereda Miercurea Ciuc players
Romanian sportspeople of Hungarian descent